Felix Staroscik (20 May 1920 – 7 August 2009) was a Polish footballer who played as a winger for Third Lanark, Northampton Town and Bedford Town.

Born in Silesia, Poland, Staroscik played football for the Polish Army. By the end of the Second World War, he had moved to England as a refugee. He signed for Wolverhampton Wanderers as an amateur, but failed to make a first team appearance before transferring to Scottish side Third Lanark. He turned professional with the club, and went on to score 33 goals in 81 appearances before joining Northampton Town in July 1951.

Although he was a leading goalscorer for the reserves, Staroscik was unable to keep a regular place in the first team at Northampton. During his four-year spell at the club, he made 49 league appearances, scoring 19 goals, before moving to Bedford Town in 1955. At Bedford, Staroscik played a role in the club's 1955–56 FA Cup run, where they reached the Third Round before narrowly losing to First Division side Arsenal. Staroscik retired in 1958 and joined the coaching staff at Bedford, but came out of retirement to play for Potton United during the 1959–60 season.

References

1920 births
2009 deaths
Polish footballers
Association football wingers
Third Lanark A.C. players
English Football League players
Northampton Town F.C. players
Bedford Town F.C. players
Expatriate footballers in England
Polish expatriate footballers
Expatriate footballers in Scotland
Scottish Football League players
Polish expatriate sportspeople in England
Polish expatriate sportspeople in Scotland
Polish military personnel of World War II